Qarah Aghaj is a city in East Azerbaijan Province, Iran.

Qarah Aghaj, Qareh Aghaj, Qareh Aqaj, Qara Aqaj, Qarah Aqaj  and similar may refer to:

Ardabil Province
Qarah Aghaj-e Bala, a village in Germi County
Qarah Aghaj-e Pain, a village in Germi County
Qarah Aghaj, Meshgin Shahr, a village in Meshgin Shahr County
Qarah Aghaj Poshteh, a village in Meshgin Shahr County

East Azerbaijan Province
Qarah Aghaj-e Kushk, a village in Charuymaq County
 Qareh Aghaj Rud, a village in Hashtrud County
Qarah Aghaj, East Azerbaijan, a village in Shabestar County
Qarah Aghaj, a city in Charuymaq County.

Fars Province
Qarah Aqaj Sand Quarry, in Qir and Karzin County

Golestan Province
Qareh Aghaj, Golestan

Hamadan Province
Qarah Aghaj, Hamadan

Isfahan Province
Qarah Aqaj, Isfahan, a village in Semirom County

North Khorasan Province
Qarah Aqaj, North Khorasan

Qazvin Province
Qareh Aghaj, Qazvin

Razavi Khorasan Province
Qareh Aghaj, Razavi Khorasan

West Azerbaijan Province
Qarah Aghaj, Khoy, a village in Khoy County
Qareh Aghaj, Maku, a village in Maku County
Qarah Aghaj, Showt, a village in Showt County
Qarah Aghaj, Urmia, a village in Urmia County
Qareh Aghaj, Sumay-ye Beradust, a village in Urmia County
Qarah Aghaj-e Olya, West Azerbaijan, a village in Urmia County

Zanjan Province
Qarah Aghaj, Abhar, Zanjan Province
Qareh Aghaj, Zanjan, Zanjan Province
Qarah Aghaj-e Olya, Zanjan
Qarah Aghaj-e Sofla, Zanjan Province
Qareh Aqajlu, Zanjan Province

See also
 Karaağaç, alternate spelling of the phrase